Hypersara is a genus of parasitic flies in the family Tachinidae.

Species
Hypersara angustifrons (Malloch, 1935)
Hypersara argentata Villeneuve, 1935
Hypersara metopina Mesnil, 1953

References

Diptera of Africa
Diptera of Asia
Exoristinae
Tachinidae genera
Taxa named by Joseph Villeneuve de Janti